Petrus Norbertus van Reysschoot or Pieter Norbert van Reysschoot (4 April 1738, in Ghent – 12 February 1795, in Ghent) was a Flemish painter, draughtsman, decorator, educator and art collector.  He spent his career in Ghent.  He is known for his decorative projects in local residences and churches and in particular his grisaille paintings.  His subject matter ranged from landscapes, allegories, mythological and religious stories, genre scenes and trompe-l'œil still lifes.

Life
Petrus Norbertus van Reysschoot was born in Ghent as the son of Emanuel Petrus Franciscus and Catherina du Bois.  He was member of a family of artists which included a large number of painters in the 18th century.  The first artist of the family was Petrus Johannes van Reysschoot, a painter and printmaker who is known for his genre scenes, hunting scenes, landscapes, portraits and Christian religious subjects. Petrus Norbertus’ father was the brother of Petrus Johannes van Reysschoot and was known for his wide range of decorative work. Petrus Norbertus was the brother of Johannes Emanuel and Anna Maria van Reysschoot who both became painters. 

Petrus Norbertus trained with his father and was admitted as a master in the Guild of Saint Luke of Ghent at the very young age of 15.  He remained a member of the Guild until it was abolished in 1773.  He became a successful artist who enjoyed the patronage of the well-off bourgeoisie of Ghent.  He also worked for religious institutions.  In 1764 he got a commission from the abbey of Boudeloo in Ghent for which he created some grisailles for the choir. 

In 1770 he was appointed to the post of 'first professor' of the Royal Academy of Fine Arts of Ghent.  He taught dissection, architecture and perspective. In this role he made a translation into Dutch of the architecture manual of the French architect Jean-François Blondel.  It was published in 1792 by P. F. de Goes under the title . 

He obtained in 1773 the commission to illustrate the annual registers of the aldermen of Ghent, a job his recently deceased father had undertaken before.  In 1774 he obtained the commission to paint grisailles for the Saint Bavo Cathedral of Ghent. 

For the Joyous Entry of Joseph II, Holy Roman Emperor into Ghent of 1781, the city built a temporary podium on the Vrijdagmarkt in Ghent. Van Reysschoot was invited to provide the final decorations for the podium.  He made a large painting that depicted the 'Loan Tribute of the States', of which two preliminary studies and three designs have survived.

Van Reysschoot participated in various competitions to gain commissions. When it moved to the Pakhuis in 1785, the Chamber of Commerce of Ghent organized a competition to decorate its new premises, which was won by van Reysschoot. One of the paintings he created for the Chamber is now in the Town Hall of Ghent. It represents an Allegory of the Ghent trade. 

Pieter Norbert van Reysschoot received commissions to decorate many private residences. This includes the painting in the dining room of the van Goethem residence.  In the Van den Bogaerde residence in the Nederpolder he was responsible for the decoration of the dining room in which he was assisted by his sister Anna Maria. 

The artist remained single for a long time, probably completely absorbed by his busy work schedule.  Only at the age of 52 he married Marie-Anne-Colette Janssens on 14 October 1790. Less than five years later he died on 12 February 1795.

Work
Petrus Norbertus van Reysschoot was a prolific painter who painted landscapes, allegories, mythological and religious stories, genre scenes, seascapes, landscapes, portraits and trompe-l'œil still lifes.  He was mainly active as a decorative painter working on commissions for individuals and religious institutions. He also painted temporary decorations for theater performances, ceremonies and festivities. He further designed statues and architectural elements of buildings. 

He applied himself especially to grisaille painting, a genre then very much in fashion for its imitation of white marble bas-reliefs. Van Reysschoot gave this genre a new importance in the field of religious subjects. His main work, which made him especially known, is the series of eleven grisailles which decorate the choir of the Saint-Bavo Cathedral in Ghent, above the stalls of the choir. Five of these panels represent scenes from the Old Testament, the other six, episodes borrowed from the Gospel. These paintings were placed in the church from 1789 to 1791. 

Van Reysschoot did not limit himself to monochrome painting alone as he was also a good colorist. He sometimes worked in both genres simultaneously. This is  obvious in the decoration of the splendid residence of the Counts of Hane-Steenhuyse, where he created works in grisaille along colored walls and ceilings.

References

External links

1738 births
1795 deaths
Flemish landscape painters
Flemish genre painters
Trompe-l'œil artists
Artists from Ghent